Matthew "Matt" Chessé (born October 27, 1965) is an American film editor, producer, and director who is mainly associated with Independent films. He was nominated for the Academy Award for Best Film Editing for Finding Neverland (2004). Chessé has edited most of the films directed by Marc Forster.

Early life
Chessé was born and raised in the San Francisco Bay area, and received a bachelor's degree in English literature from San Francisco State University. He attended Ygnacio Valley High School in the SF/EastBay city of Concord graduating with the Class of 1984.

Career
After college he was invited to relocate to Los Angeles to assist Peter Kagan, a director of commercials, at Stiefel and Co.. He next worked as an assistant to Angus Wall, an editor at the commercial editorial shop Rock, Paper, Scissors. Chessé became an editor under the tutelage of David Lee and Lauren Zuckerman. His first project with Marc Forster was on the film Everything Put Together (2000), which led to their collaboration on the very successful film Monster's Ball (2001).

Awards
Chessé has been elected to membership in the American Cinema Editors.

He has been nominated, for an Oscar in 2005: Best Achievement in Editing for Finding Neverland (2004), an Eddie in 2005: Best Edited Feature Film – Dramatic for Finding Neverland (2004), and a Satellite Award in 2008: Best Film Editing for Quantum of Solace (2008) which he shared with: Richard Pearson)

Personal life
Chessé currently lives in Los Angeles, California with his wife, two children, Clover and Coco, and one dog named Shortbread.

Editing credits
Matthew Chessé began his career as an editor. His editing credits include:

 Everything Put Together (2000)
 Monster's Ball (2001)
 Finding Neverland (2004)
 Stay (2005)
 Ellie Parker (2005)
 Stranger Than Fiction (2006)
 The Kite Runner (2007)
 Quantum of Solace (2008)
 Warrior (2011)
 Machine Gun Preacher (2011)
 World War Z (2013)
 Fort Bliss (2013)
 The Best of Me (2014)
 The Gift (2015)
 Money Monster (2016)
 Christopher Robin (2018)
 Music (2021)
 Sweet Girl (2021)
 A Man Called Otto (2022)
 White Bird: A Wonder Story'' (TBA)

References

External links
 
 Puccio, John J. (2005). "Interview with Matt Chesse", webpage posted March 20, 2005 on the DVDTown.com website; archived at WebCite on 2008-07-06 from this original URL.

Film producers from California
American film editors
American Cinema Editors
San Francisco State University alumni
1965 births
Living people
Film directors from San Francisco